The 2018 Trofeo Alfredo Binda-Comune di Cittiglio was the 43rd running of the Trofeo Alfredo Binda, a women's cycling race in Italy. It was the third event of the 2018 UCI Women's World Tour season and was held on 18 March 2017. The race started in Gavirate and finished in Cittiglio, on the outskirts of Lago Maggiore in Northwest Italy.

Polish rider Kasia Niewiadoma won the race after a solo attack. A group of 20 riders was formed during the final lap, on the Colle del Casale, from which Niewiadoma broke clear at 8 km from the finish. She held her lead to claim her third World Tour win. Chantal Blaak won the sprint for second place at 23 seconds ahead of Marianne Vos.

Teams
Twenty-four teams participated in the race. Each team had a maximum of six riders:

Results

See also
2018 in women's road cycling

References

External links

2018 in Italian sport
2018
2018 UCI Women's World Tour
Trofeo Alfredo Binda-Comune di Cittiglio